Happy Wife, Happy Life is a Philippine morning talk show that broadcast on TV5 and premiered on January 19, 2015. It is hosted by Danica Pingris, LJ Alapag, Jeck Maierhofer and RR Enriquez. It airs every Monday to Friday at 10:30am (PST) before Solved na Solved.

The program moved from 10:30am to an earlier 10:00am timeslot on March 9, 2015. On April 6, 2015, the program announced with its season 2. Mariel Rodriguez-Padilla joins as a new host, together with Danica Sotto-Pingris and LJ Moreno-Alapag. On April 20, the program once again moved to the 10:15am timeslot.

Current hosts
 Danica Sotto
 Gelli de Belen
LJ Moreno

Guest hosts
 Janice de Belen
 Candy Pangilinan

Former hosts 
RR Enriquez
Jeck Maierhofer
Mariel Rodriguez-Padilla

See also 
 List of programs broadcast by TV5

References

External links 
 

TV5 (Philippine TV network) original programming
Philippine television talk shows
2015 Philippine television series debuts
2015 Philippine television series endings
Filipino-language television shows